Claude Félix Abel Niépce de Saint-Victor (26 July 1805, Saint-Cyr, Saône-et-Loire – 7 April 1870, Paris) was a French photographic inventor. An army lieutenant and cousin of Nicéphore Niépce, he first experimented in 1847 with negatives made with albumen on glass, a method subsequently used by the Langenheim brothers for their lantern slides. At his laboratory near Paris, Niépce de Saint-Victor worked on the fixation of natural photographic colour as well as the perfection of his cousin's heliographic process for photomechanical printing. His method of photomechanical printing, called heliogravure, was published in 1856 in Traité pratique de gravure héliographique. In the 1850s he also published frequently in La Lumière.

Near-discovery of radioactivity
 
In 1804 the German chemist Adolph Ferdinand Gehlen (1775-1815) had noticed that when a solution of uranium chloride in ether was exposed to sunlight, it quickly changed color (from bright yellow to green) and precipitated.

In the 1850s, Niépce de Saint-Victor was trying to develop color photography, using light-sensitive metal salts, including uranium salts.  Beginning in 1857, long before Henri Becquerel's famous serendipitous discovery of radioactivity in 1896, Niépce de Saint-Victor observed that, even in complete darkness, certain salts could expose photographic emulsions.  He soon realized that uranium salts were responsible for this anomalous phenomenon.  (Photographers in France, England, and Germany soon confirmed Niepce's findings regarding uranium.)  Niépce recognized that the "light" that was exposing his photographic plates was neither conventional phosphorescence nor fluorescence:  the salts could expose photographic plates long after the salts had last been exposed to sunlight.  Niépce's superior, Michel Eugène Chevreul, recognized the phenomenon as a fundamental discovery ("une découverte capitale"), pointing out that uranium salts retained their power to expose photographic plates even after six months in the dark ("encore actif six mois après son insolation").  By 1861, Niépce stated frankly that uranium salts emitted some sort of radiation that was invisible to the human eye: Original :  " … cette activité persistante … ne peut mème pas être de la phosphorescence, car elle ne durerait pas si longtemps, d'après les expériences de M. Edmond Becquerel; il est donc plus probable que c'est un rayonnement invisible à nos yeux, comme le croit M. Léon Foucault, … ."  Translation :  " … this persistent activity … cannot be due to phosphorescence, for it [i.e., phosphorescence] would not last so long, according to the experiments of Mr. Edmond Becquerel; it is thus more likely that it is a radiation that is  invisible to our eyes, as Mr. Léon Foucault believes, … ." 
Note especially that Niépce mentions "Edmond Becquerel", the father of Henri Becquerel, who would later be credited with the discovery of radioactivity.  Indeed, in 1868, Edmond Becquerel published a book, La lumière:  ses causes et ses effets (Light:  its causes and its effects), in which he mentioned Niépce's findings; specifically, that objects that were coated with uranium nitrate could expose photographic plates in the dark.

See also 
 Frederick Langenheim

References

External links

1805 births
1870 deaths
People from Saône-et-Loire
19th-century French inventors